Cameron Millar (born 2001/2002) is a New Zealand rugby union player who plays for  in the National Provincial Championship (NPC). His playing position is first five-eighth (fly-half).

Early life
Millar attended Gore High School and Otago Boys' High School. Millar moved to Dunedin in 2019. He has played club rugby for Taieri RFC.

Rugby career
He made his debut on 31 October in a non-competition match scoring 21 points in a 33–28 win against .

In 2021 Millar played for the Highlanders under-20 team.

Reference list

External links
Itsrugby.co.uk profile

New Zealand rugby union players
Living people
Rugby union fly-halves
Otago rugby union players
People educated at Gore High School
People educated at Otago Boys' High School
2000s births
Highlanders (rugby union) players